Band Wagon is the 1975 debut solo album of Japanese musician Shigeru Suzuki recorded with musicians from Los Angeles. Two singles were released from the album "The Smell of August"/"Snow Express" and "100-Watt Lover", both in 1975.

Background and recording
The solo album followed the disbanding of Happy End and formation of Tin Pan Alley with Haruomi Hosono and Masataka Matsutoya. Suzuki's fellow Happy End bandmate Takashi Matsumoto wrote the lyrics to the songs.

The album features American musicians from notable acts such as Little Feat, Santana and Sly and the Family Stone. Suzuki had previously worked with Bill Payne, Dick Hyde and Kirby Johnson on Happy End's final album.

The track "Woman in the Dunes" was named after the novel of the same name and its film adaptation.

Touring and live recordings
To tour the record, Suzuki formed the band , consisting of keyboardist Hiroshi Sato, bassist Akihiro Tanaka, and drummer Toshiaki Hayashi. The group played around 10 shows, before disbanding on November 16, 1975.

Live recordings from the tour appear on 2008's Shigeru Suzuki History Box - Crown Years 1974-1979 box set. In 2014, Suzuki performed Band Wagon in its entry for his Get Back Sessions Special "Band Wagon" Live concert video. It peaked at number 272 on Oricon's DVD chart. A 2-disc live album recorded during the original 1975 tour on April 4 and May 15 was released on September 23, 2015 under the title 1975 Live.

Track listing

Personnel
According to 2008 re-release CD booklet:
 Shigeru Suzuki – all vocals & guitar, strings synthesizer on track 9
 Bill Payne – piano on tracks 2, 5, 6, 8 & 9, electric piano on tracks 3 & 4
 Doug Rauch – bass on tracks 1–3, 5–7 & 9
 Greg Errico – drums on tracks 3, 5, 6 & 9
 David Garibaldi – drums on tracks 1, 2 & 7
 Don Grusin – keyboards on tracks 1 & 7, clavinet on track 3
 Wendy Haas – clavinet on tracks 5 & 6, strings synthesizer on track 6
 Richie Hayward – drums on tracks 4 & 8
 Ken Gradney – bass on tracks 4 & 8
 Sam Clayton – congas on tracks 4 & 8
 Gene Goe – trumpet on track 2
 Pete Christlieb – tenor saxophone on track 2
 Dick Slyde Hyde – trombone on tracks 2
 Kirby Johnson – horn arranger on tracks 2, 3, 7 & 9
Technical
 Dane Butcher – engineer
 Mike Boshears – recording engineer
 Bernie Grundman – mastering engineer

References

External links
  from Suzuki's 2014 Get Back Sessions Special "Band Wagon" Live concert video

1975 debut albums
Shigeru Suzuki albums